The Academy Award for Best International Feature Film (formerly known as Best Foreign Language Film prior to 2020) is handed out annually by the U.S.-based Academy of Motion Picture Arts and Sciences to a feature-length motion picture produced outside the United States of America with a predominantly non-English dialogue track.

When the first Academy Awards ceremony was held on May 16, 1929, to honor films released in 1927–28, there was no separate category for foreign language films. Between 1947 and 1955, the Academy presented Special/Honorary Awards to the best foreign language films released in the United States. These awards, however, were not handed out on a regular basis (no award was given in 1953), and were not competitive since there were no nominees but simply one winning film per year. For the 1956 Academy Awards, a competitive Academy Award of Merit, known as the Best Foreign Language Film Award, was created for non-English speaking films, and has been given annually since then.

Unlike other Academy Awards, the Best International Feature Film Award is not presented to a specific individual. It is accepted by the winning film's director, but is considered an award for the submitting country as a whole. , the Academy changed its rules so that the name of the director is etched onto the Oscar statuette, in addition to the film's country. The director also gets to keep the statuette.

Over the years, the Best International Feature Film and its predecessors have been given almost exclusively to European films: out of the 74 awards handed out by the Academy since 1947 to foreign language films, fifty-seven have gone to European films, nine to Asian films, five to films from the Americas and three to African films. The late Italian filmmaker Federico Fellini directed four winning motion pictures during his lifetime, more than any other director. If Special Awards are taken into account, then Fellini's record is tied by his countryman Vittorio De Sica. The Soviet epic War and Peace (1966–67), for its part, is the longest motion picture to have won the Best Foreign Language Film Award. Filmed from 1962 to 1966, it ran for more than seven hours.

Winners and nominees

In the following table, the years are listed as per Academy convention, and generally correspond to the year of film release; the ceremonies are always held the following year. Films in bold and dark blue background have received an Academy Award; winning films from 1947 to 1955 won a Special/Honorary Award as denoted in the key, while all other winning films won a regular Academy Award of Merit.
Films that are neither highlighted nor in bold are the nominees. When sorted chronologically, the table always lists the winning film first and then the four other nominees.

The Submitting country column indicates the country that officially submitted the film to the Academy, and is not necessarily indicative of the film's main country of production. The original titles of the films are also mentioned, as well as the names of the directors and the languages used in the dialogue track, even though none of these elements is officially included in the nomination.

When several languages are used in a film, the predominant one is always listed first; the names of the other languages are written in smaller typesize and placed between brackets. When a film's original title is in a language that uses a non-Latin script, it is first transliterated into the Latin alphabet and then written in its original script.

Films from the former Yugoslavia are written in both Latin and Cyrillic due to the fact that the previously official Serbo-Croatian language used both alphabets. Chinese film titles are romanized according to the pinyin system, and are written using the characters employed in their submitting country, i.e. traditional Chinese ones for films submitted by Hong Kong and Taiwan, and simplified Chinese ones for films submitted by the People's Republic of China.

1940s

1950s

1960s

1970s

1980s

1990s

2000s

2010s
{| class="wikitable" style="width:90%"
|- bgcolor="#bebebe"
! width="5%" | Year
! width="19%" | Film title used in nomination
! width="19%" | Original title
! width="23%" | Director(s)
! width="15%" | Submitting country
! width="15%" | Language
|-
!scope="row" rowspan=5 align="center"| 2010(83rd)
|style="background:#B0C4DE;"| In a Better World
|style="background:#B0C4DE;"| Hævnen
|style="background:#B0C4DE;"| Susanne Bier
|style="background:#B0C4DE;"|  Denmark
|style="background:#B0C4DE;"| Danish
|-
| colspan="2" | Biutiful
| Alejandro González Iñárritu
|  Mexico
| Spanish
|-
| Dogtooth
| Kynodontas (Κυνόδοντας)
| Yorgos Lanthimos
|  Greece
| Greek
|-
| colspan="2" | Incendies
| Denis Villeneuve
|  Canada
| French
|-
| Outside the Law
| Hors-la-loi
| Rachid Bouchareb
|  Algeria
| French / Arabic
|-
|-
!scope="row" rowspan=5 align="center"| 2011(84th)
|style="background:#B0C4DE;"| A Separation
|style="background:#B0C4DE;"| Jodaei-ye Naader az Simin (جدایی نادر از سیمین)
|style="background:#B0C4DE;"| Asghar Farhadi
|style="background:#B0C4DE;"|  Iran
|style="background:#B0C4DE;"| Persian
|-
| Bullhead
| Rundskop
| Michaël R. Roskam
|  Belgium
| Dutch
|-
| Footnote
| He'arat Shulayim (הערת שוליים)
| Joseph Cedar
|  Israel
| Hebrew
|-
| In Darkness
| W ciemności
| Agnieszka Holland
|  Poland
| Polish
|-
| colspan="2" | Monsieur Lazhar
| Philippe Falardeau
|  Canada
| French
|-
|-
!scope="row" rowspan=5 align="center"| 2012(85th)
|colspan="2" style="background:#B0C4DE;"| Amour
|style="background:#B0C4DE;"| Michael Haneke
|style="background:#B0C4DE;"|  Austria
|style="background:#B0C4DE;"| French
|-
| colspan="2" | Kon-Tiki
| Joachim Rønning and Espen Sandberg
|  Norway
| Norwegian
|-
| colspan="2" | No
| Pablo Larraín
|  Chile
| Spanish
|-
| A Royal Affair
| En kongelig affære
| Nikolaj Arcel
|  Denmark
| Danish
|-
| War Witch
| Rebelle
| Kim Nguyen
|  Canada
| French / Lingala
|-
!scope="row" rowspan=5 align="center"| 2013(86th)
|style="background:#B0C4DE;"| The Great Beauty
|style="background:#B0C4DE;"| La grande bellezza
|style="background:#B0C4DE;"| Paolo Sorrentino
|style="background:#B0C4DE;"|  Italy
|style="background:#B0C4DE;"| Italian
|-
| colspan="2" | The Broken Circle Breakdown
| Felix van Groeningen
|  Belgium
| Dutch
|-
| The Hunt
| Jagten
| Thomas Vinterberg
|  Denmark
| Danish
|-
| The Missing Picture
| L'image manquante
| Rithy Panh
|  Cambodia
| French
|-
| Omar
| Omar (عمر)
| Hany Abu-Assad
|  Palestine
| Arabic
|-
!scope="row" rowspan=5 align="center"| 2014(87th)
|colspan="2" style="background:#B0C4DE;"| Ida
|style="background:#B0C4DE;"| Paweł Pawlikowski
|style="background:#B0C4DE;"|  Poland
|style="background:#B0C4DE;"| Polish
|-
| Leviathan
| Левиафан
| Andrey Zvyagintsev
|  Russia
| Russian
|-
| Tangerines
| Mandariinid
| Zaza Urushadze
|  Estonia
| EstonianRussian
|-
| colspan="2" | Timbuktu
| Abderrahmane Sissako
|  Mauritania
| Tamasheq / Bambara / Arabic / French
|-
| Wild Tales
| Relatos Salvajes
| Damián Szifron
|  Argentina
| Spanish
|-
!scope="row" rowspan=5 align="center| 2015(88th) 
|style="background:#B0C4DE;"|Son of Saul
|style="background:#B0C4DE;"|Saul fia
|style="background:#B0C4DE;"|László Nemes
|style="background:#B0C4DE;"| Hungary
|style="background:#B0C4DE;"| Hungarian
|-
|Embrace of the Serpent
|El abrazo de la serpiente
|Ciro Guerra
| Colombia
| Spanish
|-
|colspan="2" | Mustang
|Deniz Gamze Ergüven
| France
|Turkish
|-
|Theeb
|Theeb (ذيب)
|Naji Abu Nowar
| Jordan
|Arabic
|-
|A War
|Krigen
|Tobias Lindholm
| Denmark
|Danish
|-
!scope="row" rowspan=5 align="center|2016(89th)
|style="background:#B0C4DE;"|The Salesman
|style="background:#B0C4DE;"|Forushandeh (فروشنده)
|style="background:#B0C4DE;"|Asghar Farhadi
|style="background:#B0C4DE;"| Iran
|style="background:#B0C4DE;"|Persian
|-
|Land of Mine
|Under sandet
|Martin Zandvliet
| Denmark
|German / Danish
|-
|A Man Called Ove
|En man som heter Ove
|Hannes Holm
| Sweden
|Swedish
|-
|colspan="2" | Tanna
|Martin Butler and Bentley Dean
| Australia
|Nauvhal
|-
|colspan="2" | Toni Erdmann
|Maren Ade
| Germany
|German
|-
!scope="row" rowspan=5 align="center |2017(90th)
|style="background:#B0C4DE;"|A Fantastic Woman
|style="background:#B0C4DE;"|Una mujer fantástica
|style="background:#B0C4DE;"|Sebastián Lelio
|style="background:#B0C4DE;"| Chile
|style="background:#B0C4DE;"| Spanish
|-
|The Insult
|ʼadiyye raʼam 23 (قضية رقم ٢٣)
|Ziad Doueiri
| Lebanon
|Arabic (Lebanese) 
|-
|Loveless
|Nelyubov (Нелюбовь)
|Andrey Zvyagintsev
| Russia
|Russian
|-
|On Body and Soul
|Testről és lélekről
|Ildikó Enyedi
| Hungary
|Hungarian
|-
|colspan="2"|The Square
|Ruben Östlund
| Sweden
|Swedish / Danish / English
|-
!scope="row" rowspan=5 align="center|2018(91st)
|colspan="2" style="background:#B0C4DE;"|Roma
|style="background:#B0C4DE;"|Alfonso Cuarón
|style="background:#B0C4DE;"| Mexico
|style="background:#B0C4DE;"|
|-
| Capernaum
| Capharnaüm (کفرناحوم)
| Nadine Labaki
|  Lebanon
| Arabic (Lebanese)
|-
| Cold War
| Zimna wojna
| Paweł Pawlikowski
|  Poland
| Polish
|-
| Never Look Away
| Werk ohne Autor
| Florian Henckel von Donnersmarck
|  Germany
| German
|-
| Shoplifters
| 
| Hirokazu Kore-eda
|  Japan
| Japanese
|-
!scope="row" rowspan=5 align="center| 2019(92nd)
|style="background:#B0C4DE;"| Parasite
|style="background:#B0C4DE;"| Gisaengchung (기생충)|style="background:#B0C4DE;"| Bong Joon-ho|style="background:#B0C4DE;"|  South Korea|style="background:#B0C4DE;"| Korean|-
|Corpus Christi
|Boże Ciało
|Jan Komasa
| Poland
|
|-
| Honeyland
| Medena Zemja (Медена земја)
| Tamara Kotevska and Ljubomir Stefanov
|  North Macedonia
| Macedonian / Turkish / Bosnian
|-
| colspan="2"|Les Misérables
| Ladj Ly
|  France
| French
|-
| Pain and Glory
| Dolor y Gloria
| Pedro Almodóvar
|  Spain
| Spanish
|}

2020s

 Multiple winners 
Six directors have won the award more than once.

Shortlisted finalists
Since the 79th Academy Awards (2006), a nine-film shortlist has been announced before the nominations, which then has been reduced to the five official nominees. The shortlist was expanded from nine to ten at the 92nd Academy Awards (2019), and from ten to fifteen at the 93rd Academy Awards (2020).

See also
 Academy Award for Best International Feature Film
 List of countries by number of Academy Awards for Best International Feature Film
 List of actors nominated for Academy Awards for non-English performances
 List of Academy Award–winning foreign-language films (in categories other than the International Feature Film category itself)
 Saturn Award for Best International Film

NotesA: Europe's tally includes three awards won by the Soviet Union and an award won by Russia. It also includes five Special/Honorary Awards: two won by Italy, two won by France and one shared between them for The Walls of Malapaga (1949).B: Japan's four-award tally includes three Honorary Awards.C: Shoe-Shine (1946) won a Special Award because "the high quality of this motion picture, brought to eloquent life in a country scarred by war, is proof to the world that the creative spirit can triumph over adversity".D: Monsieur Vincent (1947) won a Special Foreign Language Film Award. It was voted by the Academy Board of Governors as the most outstanding foreign language film released in the United States during 1948.E: Bicycle Thieves (1948) won a Special Foreign Language Film Award. It was voted by the Academy Board of Governors as the most outstanding foreign language film released in the United States during 1949.F: The Walls of Malapaga (1949) won an Honorary Foreign Language Film Award. It was voted by the Board of Governors as the most outstanding foreign language film released in the United States in 1950.G: Rashomon (1950) won an Honorary Foreign Language Film Award. It was voted by the Board of Governors as the most outstanding foreign language film released in the United States during 1951.H: Forbidden Games (1952) won an Honorary Foreign Language Film Award. It was named Best Foreign Language Film first released in the United States during 1952.I: Gate of Hell (1953) won an Honorary Foreign Language Film Award. It was named Best Foreign Language Film first released in the United States during 1954.J: Samurai, The Legend of Musashi (1954) won an Honorary Foreign Language Film Award. It was named Best Foreign Language Film first released in the United States during 1955.K: For the 29th Academy Awards, the names of the producers were included in the nominations for the Foreign Language Film category. Dino De Laurentiis and Carlo Ponti won the award for La Strada (1954). Gyula Trebitsch and Walter Koppel were nominated for The Captain of Köpenick (1956), Annie Dorfmann for Gervaise (1956), Masayuki Takagi for Harp of Burma (1956), and O. Dalsgaard-Olsen for Qivitoq (1956).
L: The film received its 1969 nomination under the title My Night with Maud. It had no U.S. distributor at the time. When it was released in Los Angeles on April 15, 1970, it became eligible for consideration for Academy Awards in other categories, and received a 1970 nomination for Writing under the title My Night at Maud's. Today, the latter title is the most commonly used when referring to the film in the English-speaking world.
M: Originally released under the title La Victoire en chantant, the film was reissued in France under the title Noirs et Blancs en couleur (a literal French translation of its English title Black and White in Color) following its 1976 Academy Award win.
N: Although films produced inside the United States are not eligible for consideration for the Best Foreign Language Film Award, those produced in U.S. overseas possessions were eligible at the time. Puerto Rico, an unincorporated territory of the United States, was thus able to receive a nomination for What Happened to Santiago (1989). However, this rule was changed in 2011 barring Puerto Rican submissions.
O: This is not an official nomination. After the nominations were announced, information came to light that showed this film was wholly produced in Argentina, and had insufficient Uruguayan artistic control. The film was declared ineligible and removed from the final ballot.
However, following protests from pro-Israeli groups in the United States, the Academy decided to designate it as a submission from the Palestinian Authority, a move that was decried by the film's director Hany Abu-Assad. During the awards ceremony, the film was eventually announced by presenter Will Smith as a submission from the Palestinian Territories.

References
General
 
Specific

External links
 
 
 

Academy Award for Best International Feature Film